George Thomas Plunkett (?–8 May 1827) was an Irish Roman Catholic clergyman who served as the Bishop of Elphin from 1814 to 1827.

References

1827 deaths
Roman Catholic bishops of Elphin
Year of birth missing